Project Reach NYC is a non-profit organization in New York City that focuses on the empowerment of youth. It was founded in 1971 by several Asian American community activists to help immigrant youth in response to the rise of Chinese youth gangs in the city.

References 

1971 establishments in New York City